Sven Hüber (born 1964) is an East German former political officer. As such his duties consisted of communist political indoctrination and propaganda. His unit was found by German courts to be responsible for several crimes, including the murder of Chris Gueffroy. Today he is chairman of the main personnel council of the German Federal Police and holds the rank Erster Polizeihauptkommissar. His subsequent employment as a policeman in reunified Germany has been the subject of fierce criticism and controversy.

Career

Hüber was born in Görlitz. As a political officer, Hüber was responsible for giving the soldiers political instruction and propaganda. He worked for the Berlin regiment 33 (Treptow). His unit was responsible for the fatal shooting on February 6, 1989 of Chris Gueffroy, the last person to be shot on the inner German border. Hüber has tried to ban the mention of his name in connection with his work as political officer and has sued a German historian. His case and the question of how to deal with moral responsibility have been widely discussed in German newspapers.

A similar case happened in March 2008, when Holm Singer, a former East German Stasi informant who betrayed local church officials under the pseudonym IM Schubert, won a court battle to prevent an exhibition from including his real name and clandestine activities. The interim injunction was later cancelled, as his name was considered to be of "historical interest".

References

Further reading
 Roman Grafe: Deutsche Gerechtigkeit. Prozesse gegen DDR-Grenzschützen und ihre Befehlsgeber. München: Siedler, 2004. 
 Regina Mönch: "Deutsche Gerechtigkeit. Die zweite Karriere des Politoffiziers". Frankurter Allgemeine Zeitung, December 5, 2006.
 "Thierse protestiert gegen Buchverbot. SPD- und Unionspolitiker für Aufklärung der DDR-Diktatur". Süddeutsche Zeitung, December 8, 2006.
 Joachim Güntner: "Exempel einer Wende". Neue Zürcher Zeitung, December 9, 2006.
 "Ich kann gar nicht so viel fressen, wie ich kotzen möchte ... Ein Buchverbot, ein Gerichtstermin und ein Brief des Schriftstellers Ralph Giordano im Wortlaut". Südthüringer Zeitung, March 8, 2007.

External links
 "Kammergericht stärkt Pressefreiheit" (Wikinews, March 20, 2007)
 Roman Grafe: Die Privilegierung von Staatskriminellen. Prozesse gegen DDR-Grenzschützen und ihre Befehlsgeber (University of Trento, April 2006)
 Sven Hüber: "Unerträgliche Äußerung des Herrn Hubertus Knabe" (Berliner Zeitung, May 10, 2004)

1964 births
Living people
GDR Border Troops people
German police officers
National People's Army personnel
Communist repression
People from Görlitz